Dead Wonderland is the second album released by Koji Nakamura under the moniker of iLL. It was released by the record company Phantom Sound & Vision in 2008.

Track listing

References

2008 albums